The 1992 Arab Cup Winners' Cup was the third edition of the Arab Cup Winners' Cup held in Jeddah, Saudi Arabia for the second time between 18 – 27 Nov 1993, one year after. The teams represented Arab nations from Africa and Asia.
CO Casablanca of Morocco won the final for the second time against Al-Sadd of Qatar.

Group stage

Group 1

Group 2

Knock-out stage

Semi-finals

Final

Winners

External links
Arab Cup Winners' Cup 1992 - rsssf.com

Arab Cup Winners' Cup
1992 in association football
International association football competitions hosted by Saudi Arabia
1992 in Saudi Arabian sport